Mithun Manjunath (born 28 June 1998) is an Indian badminton player. He became the Indian National Badminton Champion in men's singles in 2023.

Achievements

BWF World Tour (1 runner-up)
The BWF World Tour, which was announced on 19 March 2017 and implemented in 2018, is a series of elite badminton tournaments sanctioned by the Badminton World Federation (BWF). The BWF World Tour is divided into levels of World Tour Finals, Super 1000, Super 750, Super 500, Super 300, and the BWF Tour Super 100.

Men's singles

BWF International Challenge/Series (1 title, 2 runners-up) 
Men's singles

  BWF International Challenge tournament
  BWF International Series tournament
  BWF Future Series tournament

References

External links 
 

Living people
1998 births
Indian male badminton players
Racket sportspeople from Karnataka
Indian national badminton champions
21st-century Indian people